Oberhaching is a municipality in Bavaria, Germany, with 13,638 inhabitants (2020) on an area of .

Architecture
The most important buildings are the originally Romanesque church St Stephan in the centre of Oberhaching, the Gothic church Mariae Geburt in Oberbiberg, the Baroque church Holy Cross in Kreuzpullach and the Renaissance Wittelsbach mansion in Laufzorn. The small palace was built by Albert VI, Duke of Bavaria and later served as a residence for his nephew Maximilian Philipp Hieronymus, Duke of Bavaria-Leuchtenberg.

Sports
Oberhaching is home to the basketball team TSV Oberhaching Tropics who play in Germany's ProB league.

The Paraguay national football team was stationed in Oberhaching during the 2006 FIFA World Cup.

Transport
Oberhaching has its own motorway exit on the A 995, which connects the motorway junction Munich-South (and thus the A 99 and the A 8) with the Munich district of Obergiesing and the Mittlerer Ring.

At Deisenhofen station (located in the service area of the Münchner Verkehrs- und Tarifverbund (Munich Transport and Tariff Association, MVV)) on the Munich–Holzkirchen railway line and Munich East–Deisenhofen railway line, the Meridian commuter trains of the Bayerische Oberlandbahn (BOB) and the S3 line of the S-Bahn Munich stop. Another stop of the S3 is located in the district of Furth near the Bayerische Landessportschule (Bavarian State Sports School).

Notable people
Eleonore Baur (1885-1981), named Sister Pia, senior Nazi Party figure and personal friend of Adolf Hitler, lived in Oberhaching

References

External links
 

 
Munich (district)